The Minneapolis Millers were a minor league professional ice hockey team based in Minneapolis, Minnesota at the Minneapolis Arena. The Millers originated in the Central Hockey League as a semi-professional team for the 1925–26 season. The Millers, along with other CHL teams, moved to the American Hockey Association and played there from 1926 to 1931. The Millers then switched to a revived Central Hockey League based locally in Minnesota. After the CHL's demise, the Millers rejoined the AHA, where they played from 1935 to 1942. The team went on hiatus during World War II, and was revived in the  United States Hockey League from 1945–50. Lyle Wright managed from Millers from 1928 to 1931, and from 1933 to 1950.

References

External links
 CHL results 1925–26
 AHA results 1926–31, 1935–42
 CHL results 1931–35
 USHL results 1946–50

1925 establishments in Minnesota
1950 disestablishments in Minnesota
American Hockey Association (1926–1942) teams
Ice hockey clubs established in 1925
Ice hockey teams in Minnesota
Ice hockey clubs disestablished in 1950
Sports in Minneapolis